The 2016 French Open was a tennis tournament played on outdoor clay courts. It was the 120th edition of the French Open and the second Grand Slam event of the year. It took place at the Stade Roland Garros from 22 May to 5 June and consisted of events for professional players in singles, doubles and mixed doubles play. Junior and wheelchair players also took part in singles and doubles events.

Novak Djokovic won the men's singles in the 2016 edition. Stan Wawrinka was the defending champion in men's singles, but he lost to Andy Murray in the semifinals. Serena Williams was the defending champion in the women's singles, but she lost to Garbiñe Muguruza in the final.
Roger Federer withdrew before the tournament to avoid "unnecessary [fitness] risk", making this tournament the first Grand Slam he missed since the 1999 US Open. Furthermore, nine-time champion Rafael Nadal withdrew during the tournament due to injury, for the first time in his French Open career.

Novak Djokovic's victory at this tournament in his 20th Grand Slam final completed his career Grand Slam of all four major tournaments, the eighth man to do so in singles and the fifth since the start of the Open Era (after Rod Laver, Andre Agassi, Roger Federer, and Rafael Nadal). Djokovic also achieved a non-calendar year Grand Slam, becoming the first man since Rod Laver in 1969 to hold all four major titles at once. The victory by Garbiñe Muguruza was her first Grand Slam win in her second Grand Slam final.

Tournament

The 2016 French Open was the 115th edition of the French Open and was held at Stade Roland Garros in Paris.

The tournament was run by the International Tennis Federation (ITF) and was part of the 2016 ATP World Tour and the 2016 WTA Tour calendars under the Grand Slam category. The tournament consisted of men's and women's singles and doubles draws as well as a mixed doubles event.

There were singles and doubles events for both boys and girls (players under 18), and singles and doubles events for men's and women's wheelchair tennis players as part of the UNIQLO tour under the Grand Slam category. The tournament was played on clay courts and took place over a series of 22 courts, including the three main showcourts, Court Philippe Chatrier, Court Suzanne Lenglen and Court 1.

Points and prize money

Points distribution
The ranking points awarded for each event are shown below.

Senior points

Wheelchair points

Junior points

Prize money
The total prize money for the tournament was €32,017,500, an increase of 14% compared to the previous edition. The winners of both the men's and women's singles title received €2,000,000, an increase of €200,000 compared to 2015.

* per team

Singles players 
2016 French Open – Men's singles

2016 French Open – Women's singles

Day-by-day summaries

Singles seeds
The following are the seeded players and notable players who withdrew from the event. Seedings are based on ATP and WTA rankings as of 16 May 2016.  Rank and points before are as of 23 May 2016.
An * in pink signifies the player is out of the event.

Men's singles

Withdrawn players

Women's singles

† The player did not qualify for the tournament in 2015. Accordingly, points for her 16th best result are deducted instead.

Withdrawn players

Doubles seeds

Men's doubles

1 Rankings are as of 16 May 2016.

Women's doubles

 1 Rankings are as of 16 May 2016.

Mixed doubles

 1 Rankings are as of 16 May 2016.

Main draw wildcard entries
The following players were given wildcards to the main draw based on internal selection and recent performances.

Men's singles 
  Grégoire Barrère
  Julien Benneteau 
  Mathias Bourgue 
  Bjorn Fratangelo 
  Quentin Halys 
  Constant Lestienne (Revoked due to a minor breach for corruption)
  Stéphane Robert
  Jordan Thompson

Women's singles 
  Tessah Andrianjafitrimo
  Océane Dodin 
  Myrtille Georges
  Amandine Hesse 
  Alizé Lim 
  Virginie Razzano 
  Arina Rodionova
  Taylor Townsend

Men's doubles 
 Grégoire Barrère /  Quentin Halys
 Julien Benneteau /  Édouard Roger-Vasselin
 Mathias Bourgue /  Calvin Hemery
 Kenny de Schepper /  Maxime Teixeira
 David Guez /  Vincent Millot
 Tristan Lamasine /  Albano Olivetti
 Stéphane Robert /  Alexandre Sidorenko

Women's doubles 
 Tessah Andrianjafitrimo /  Claire Feuerstein
 Manon Arcangioli /  Chloé Paquet
 Clothilde de Bernardi /  Shérazad Reix
 Fiona Ferro  /  Virginie Razzano
 Stéphanie Foretz /  Amandine Hesse
 Myrtille Georges /  Alizé Lim
 Mathilde Johansson /  Pauline Parmentier

Mixed doubles
 Virginie Razzano  /  Vincent Millot
 Pauline Parmentier  /  Julien Benneteau
 Chloé Paquet /  Benoît Paire (withdrew to focus on other events) 
 Alize Lim  /  Paul-Henri Mathieu
 Alizé Cornet  /  Jonathan Eysseric
 Mathilde Johansson  /  Tristan Lamasine

Main draw qualifiers

Men's singles

Men's singles qualifiers
  Tobias Kamke 
  Radek Štěpánek
  Steve Darcis
  Jan-Lennard Struff
  Marco Trungelliti
  Carlos Berlocq
  Roberto Carballés Baena 
  Dustin Brown
  Adrian Ungur 
  Marsel İlhan
  Gerald Melzer
  Jordi Samper Montaña
  Kenny de Schepper
  Nikoloz Basilashvili 
  Laslo Djere 
  Radu Albot

Lucky losers
  Igor Sijsling
  Adam Pavlásek
  Andrej Martin
  Thomas Fabbiano

Women's singles

Women's singles qualifiers
  Louisa Chirico
  Çağla Büyükakçay 
  Sorana Cîrstea
  Sachia Vickery 
  Verónica Cepede Royg
  Kateřina Siniaková
  Daniela Hantuchová
  İpek Soylu
  Viktorija Golubic
  Sara Sorribes Tormo
  Lucie Hradecká
  Maryna Zanevska

Lucky loser
  Sílvia Soler Espinosa

Protected ranking
The following players were accepted directly into the main draw using a protected ranking:

 Men's singles
  Brian Baker (PR 56)
  Florian Mayer (PR 34)
  Janko Tipsarević (PR 39)
  Dmitry Tursunov (PR 89)

 Women's singles
  Vitalia Diatchenko (PR 91)
  Laura Robson (PR 52)
  Galina Voskoboeva (PR 64)
  Aleksandra Wozniak (PR 108)

Champions

Seniors

Men's singles

  Novak Djokovic def.  Andy Murray, 3–6, 6–1, 6–2, 6–4

Women's singles

  Garbiñe Muguruza def.  Serena Williams, 7–5, 6–4

Men's doubles

  Feliciano López /  Marc López  def.  Bob Bryan  /  Mike Bryan, 6–4, 6–7(6–8), 6–3

Women's doubles

  Caroline Garcia /  Kristina Mladenovic def.  Ekaterina Makarova /  Elena Vesnina, 6–3, 2–6, 6–4

Mixed doubles

  Martina Hingis  /  Leander Paes  def.  Sania Mirza /  Ivan Dodig, 4–6, 6–4, [10–8]

Juniors

Boys' singles

  Geoffrey Blancaneaux def.  Félix Auger-Aliassime, 1–6, 6–3, 8–6

Girls' singles

  Rebeka Masarova def.  Amanda Anisimova, 7–5, 7–5

Boys' doubles

  Yshai Oliel /  Patrik Rikl def.  Chung Yun-seong /  Orlando Luz, 6–3, 6–4

Girls' doubles

  Paula Arias Manjón  /  Olga Danilović def.  Olesya Pervushina /  Anastasia Potapova, 3–6, 6–3, [10–8]

Wheelchair events

Wheelchair men's singles

  Gustavo Fernández def.  Gordon Reid, 7–6(7–4), 6–1

Wheelchair women's singles

   Marjolein Buis def.  Sabine Ellerbrock, 6–3, 6–4

Wheelchair men's doubles

  Shingo Kunieda /  Gordon Reid def.  Michaël Jérémiasz /  Stefan Olsson, 6–3, 6–2

Wheelchair women's doubles

  Yui Kamiji /  Jordanne Whiley def.  Jiske Griffioen /  Aniek van Koot, 6–4, 4–6, [10–6]

Other events

Legends under 45 doubles

  Juan Carlos Ferrero /  Carlos Moyá def.  Sébastien Grosjean /  Fabrice Santoro, 6–4, 6–4

Legends over 45 doubles

  Sergi Bruguera /  Goran Ivanišević  def.  Yannick Noah /  Cédric Pioline, 6–3, 7–6(7–2)

Women's legends doubles

  Lindsay Davenport  /  Martina Navratilova  def.  Conchita Martínez /  Nathalie Tauziat, 6–3, 6–2

Withdrawals 

The following players were accepted directly into the main tournament, but withdrew with injuries, suspensions or personal reasons.

 Men's singles
Before the tournament
  Pablo Andújar → replaced by  Rogério Dutra Silva
  Juan Martín del Potro → replaced by  Albert Montañés
  Alexandr Dolgopolov → replaced by  Thomas Fabbiano
  Roger Federer → replaced by  Igor Sijsling
  Andreas Haider-Maurer → replaced by  Thiemo de Bakker
  Thanasi Kokkinakis → replaced by  Damir Džumhur
  Constant Lestienne → replaced by  Andrej Martin
  Gaël Monfils → replaced by  Adam Pavlásek
  Tommy Robredo → replaced by  Marco Cecchinato

During the tournament
  Rafael Nadal

 Women's singles
Before the tournament
  Belinda Bencic → replaced by  Lauren Davis
  Flavia Pennetta → replaced by  Lourdes Domínguez Lino
  Maria Sharapova → replaced by  Tatjana Maria
  Ajla Tomljanović → replaced by  Shelby Rogers
  Alison Van Uytvanck → replaced by  Aleksandra Wozniak
  Caroline Wozniacki → replaced by  Sílvia Soler Espinosa

Retirements 

 Men's singles
  Martin Kližan
  Dušan Lajović
  Nicolas Mahut
  Jo-Wilfried Tsonga

 Women's singles
  Denisa Allertová
  Victoria Azarenka

References

External links

 Roland Garros

 
 

 
2016 ATP World Tour
Open
2016 WTA Tour
2016 in Paris